Maurea muriellae is a species of sea snail, a marine gastropod mollusk, in the family Calliostomatidae within the superfamily Trochoidea, the top snails, turban snails and their allies.

Distribution
This marine species occurs off Madagascar.

References

 Vilvens, C., 2001. Description of a new species of Calliostoma (Gastropoda: Trochidae: Calliostomatinae) from Madagascar. Novapex 2(4): 175-178

Calliostomatidae